Francis Ralph Quilici (May 11, 1939 – May 14, 2018) was an American professional baseball player, coach and manager who spent his entire Major League Baseball career with the Minnesota Twins. Quilici served the team for all or part of five years as an infielder, 1 years as a coach, and 3 years as manager, then spent six more years as a broadcaster for them.

Playing career
Quilici was born in Chicago, where he graduated from St. Mel High School. He attended Loras College and Western Michigan University. In 1961, he signed with the Twins during their first year in Minneapolis–Saint Paul after they transferred from Washington. Upon entering the Twins' farm system, he rose from Class D to Triple-A over the next 4 seasons and was batting .277 with the Denver Bears when the pennant-bound 1965 Twins called him to the majors in July. With veteran incumbent second baseman Jerry Kindall suffering from a chronic hamstring injury, Quilici quickly assumed a key role in the Minnesota lineup, starting 39 games at second base during the season's final ten weeks.

Then, in the 1965 World Series, Quilici started all seven games against the Los Angeles Dodgers and collected four hits (with two doubles) in 20 at bats and a run batted in. One of his doubles touched off a six-run, third inning rally against eventual Baseball Hall of Famer Don Drysdale in Game 1. When the Twins batted around in that frame, Quilici came to the plate again and chased Drysdale with a single. His two hits in one inning tied a record and sparked an 8–2 Minnesota victory. In the field, Quilici played every inning of all seven games, making two errors in 36 chances for a .944 fielding percentage. But the Twins succumbed to another future Hall of Famer, Sandy Koufax, in Game 7, 2–0, to lose the series. Quilici had a double in three at bats in that final contest against the Dodger southpaw.

The following year, was a setback for Quilici. He spent the entire season at Triple-A Denver, as the Twins alternated Bernie Allen and César Tovar as their regular second basemen. When Quilici returned to Minnesota in  it was as a utility infielder: standout rookie Rod Carew, yet another future Hall of Famer, won the Twins' second base job and would hold it for the next eight seasons. As a player, Quilici batted .214 in 405 games played; his 146 MLB hits included 23 doubles, six triples and with five home runs. He collected 53 runs batted in.

Coach, manager and broadcaster
During the 1970–1971 offseason, a vacancy opened on manager Bill Rigney's coaching staff when Sherry Robertson was killed in an automobile accident. Looking to save a roster spot, but retain Quilici as potential insurance in case one of their infielders were injured, the Twins named the 31-year-old to fill Robertson's slot as the club's fifth coach.

With team owner Calvin Griffith seeking to shake up his 36–34 Twins which was trailing the eventual World Series champion Oakland Athletics by 9 games in third place in the American League West, Quilici was promoted to replace Rigney as manager on July 6, 1972. Age 33 at the time of his appointment, he was the youngest pilot in the major leagues that season and throughout his managerial term. The Twins went 41–43 under Quilici in 1972 in the first of three straight third-place finishes, which included 81–81 in 1973 and 82–80 in 1974. When the club fell to fourth place with a 76–83 record in 1975, Quilici was fired after a season-ending 6–4 loss to the Chicago White Sox at Metropolitan Stadium on September 28. He was replaced by Gene Mauch two months later on November 24. His record as Minnesota's manager was 280–287 (.494).

He remained associated with the Twins, however, as a radio commentator on the team's broadcasts in 1976–1977, 1980–1982 and 1987. Outside of baseball he was active in business and charitable activities in the Twin Cities region.

Frank Quilici died on May 14, 2018 at the age of 79 in Burnsville, Minnesota, after suffering from kidney disease.

References

External links

•  Interview with Frank Quilici about the Major League Baseball Players Alumni Association programs benefitting children, All About Kids! TV Series #212 (1995)

1939 births
2018 deaths
All-American college baseball players
Baseball players from Chicago
Charlotte Hornets (baseball) players
Deaths from kidney disease
Denver Bears players
Erie Sailors players
Major League Baseball bench coaches
Major League Baseball broadcasters
Major League Baseball infielders
Major League Baseball second basemen
Minnesota Twins announcers
Minnesota Twins coaches
Minnesota Twins managers
Minnesota Twins players
Sportspeople from Chicago
Western Michigan Broncos baseball players
Wilson Tobs players
Wytheville Twins players